Peter Tangvald (born Per Tangvald, 27 September 1924, died 22 June 1991) was a Norwegian sailor and adventurer. Known as one of the early deep-sea cruising pioneers and for his 1966 book Sea Gypsy, he reached notoriety after two of his seven wives had been lost at sea. He himself drowned, along with his daughter Carmen, when his engineless yacht was wrecked in Bonaire in 1991. His son Thomas escaped the accident, but suffered a similar fate when his own yacht was lost at sea years later, in 2014.

Bibliography

References 

1924 births
1991 deaths
People from Oslo
Norwegian sailors
Norwegian autobiographers
Deaths due to shipwreck at sea